Sangram Singh (born 21 July 1985) is an Indian wrestler, actor, motivational speaker, philanthropist, health guru and Honorary doctorate.
Ministry of youth affairs and sports of India choose him as a brand ambassador and Fit India Icon of Fit India Campaign, 2021   He is the face of anti-tobacco campaign "Tobacco Free India".

He has also appeared in a number of reality television shows, such as  Survivor India and was finalist of season seven of Bigg Boss in 2013 and many others. In July 2015, he won the Commonwealth Heavyweight Wrestling Championship  in the South Africa , and  again in 2016 he won Commonwealth Heavyweight Wrestling Championship. He was also  World’s best professional wrestler in 2012.

Wrestling federation of India appointed him as their official Brand  Ambassador and motivational speaker 2014 - 15.

Indian army invited Sangram Singh to motivate Army Jawan's across India in 2013.

Sangram Singh had made his way into the seventh standard Hindi textbook to encourage young children. All his struggles, victories and also his journey of becoming successful international sportsperson were mentioned in the story of the textbook.

Early life
Sangram is from the village Madina in Rohtak, Haryana. He was born into a humble family. Sangram was diagnosed with rheumatoid arthritis and was confined to a wheelchair for the first eight years of his life.
His father, Umed Singh, is a retired army soldier. His mother Ramodevi is a homemaker. Sangram was an average student in school.

Philanthropy
Sangram Singh is a philanthropist.
 He came out with an appeal to help Pulwama martyrs families.
He said that people can contact him if those families need support for education or marriage of their children.

Several schools and universities across Punjab & Haryana state have begun providing scholarship named after Sangram Singh to educate the poor and deserving students.

He also pledges all his organs for donation and motivates the same to all youths from which the deaths due to organ failure can be averted.

Sangram Singh Charitable Foundation joins hands with Yuva Unstoppable to transform bathrooms, water facilities, smart classrooms and overall fitness of 1000 government schools across India.  It begin with 200 schools in Haryana, Sangram's home town.

Now cancer sufferers from any state of the country will not be financially deprived of treatment. Sangram Singh's foundation will provide free treatment to such patients. Sangram Singh has started a campaign towards defeating cancer and making a healthy India. Cancer sufferers, women and children, contact them through the Internet media, e-mail or directly. Cancer patients will be treated completely free of cost. Its expenses will be borne by Sangram Singh Charitable Foundation.

Wrestler Sangram Singh adopted several children from all over India to educate them and  provide them a bright future.

Career

Professional Wrestling career

Sangram Singh started his career as a sportsperson with the Delhi Police in 1999.
In All India Police Games 2005 he represented Delhi Police at Chawla (New Delhi) and successfully had a bronze medal.
He was also awarded the title World's Best Professional Wrestler by World Wrestling Professionals, after a match in South Africa in 2012 for his style, stamina, and nature of wrestling.

In July 2015, Sangram won the Commonwealth Heavyweight Championship after defeating Joe E. Legend in the Last Man Standing fight in Port Elizabeth.

Prime Minister Shri Narendra Modi called Sangram Singh at the  Parliament house to congratulate him for his victory in common wealth heavyweight wrestling championship.

Sangram won the Commonwealth Heavyweight Championship for the second time on 27 March 2016, by defeating South African wrestler Ananzi, keeping the belt in India. The match was played at Port Elizabeth, South Africa.
In 2019 he bought the rights to make a biopic on the life of wrestler K. D. Jadhav, who won the first Olympic title for India in 1952. He is playing the titular role in the movie.

Social service and motivational speaking

Sangram has been involved in social service and conducts various motivational talks for corporate companies. He motivates youngsters at schools and colleges by sharing his life journey, thus being a real life motivational coach. He was a motivational speaker for Indian wrestlers who were representing India in the Commonwealth Games. Sangram has also been part of promotion to create awareness about voting in Haryana, his hometown. Singh announced the launch of the Champions Pro Khusti league in December 2015 in Mumbai. Sangram played his first international match in India in Chandigarh on 6 February 2016, the proceeds of which were dedicated to the benefit of cancer patients. Recently, Sangram Singh adopted 16 girls and 7 boys from his hometown Haryana and has sponsored their education. This is along with the adoption of a school in Satara, Maharashtra. Sangram Singh Foundation organised the first wrestling awards to felicitate and honour the forgotten heroes from wrestling who had won individual medals for India over the years on 16 September 2017 in New Delhi.

Entertainment
In 2018 Director Mahesh Bhatt presented his first music video with Sangram Singh. Sangram shared his fitness mantra with actress Raveena Tandon on her television chat show Simply Baatein. Sangram also featured in Hrithik Roshan and Discovery India's television show HRX Heroes depicting stories of real-life heroes. Sangram's journey from the wheelchair to being an international professional wrestler was portrayed in this show. DD Sports telecasted a panel discussion series titled Rio to Tokyo: Vision 2020 to encourage participation of female athletes in various fields of sports. A special show as part of the series was hosted by Sangram Singh at Haryana's MD University Rohtak on 19 December 2016. Sangram  has walked the ramp for designers like Sanjana Jon, Nitya Bajaj Birla, Dhruv Vaish in the Fashion Design Council of India.

Sportswear line
Sangram launched his sportswear range SGXbySangramSingh in Delhi on 17 March 2016 at the Fashion Design Council of India. This launch was supported by celebrity designer Rohit Bal (the council's president), Sunil Sethi and Sangram's fiancée, actress Payal Rohatgi.

Awards and recognition
Sangram received the Man of Substance award on India Men Show which took place on 18 April 2019, at the Metropolitan Hotel, New Delhi. He is also the world peace brand ambassador of Wockhardt Group. He received the title Indian Affairs Indian of the year 2014 in Sports Leadership at the 5th Annual Indian Affairs, founded by Satya Brahma, at India Leadership Conclave & Indian Affairs Business Leadership Awards 2014. He gave a motivational talk to the students of IIT Delhi in February 2016 when he was invited to the institution as a guest of honour. Recently, a chapter on Sangram's life journey has been included in Hindi textbooks for children studying in the 7th standard. A scholarship in a university under Sangram Singh has been offered to students who come from modest families. Sangram was also appointed the brand ambassador for Haryana Kabaddi League, that was organised in Haryana in June 2016. Sangram was invited by the AYUSH ministry and the NDMC to Delhi as guest of honour to motivate youngsters on International Yoga Day 2016, by sharing his life story and talking about the benefits of yoga.

Personal life
Sangram Singh hails from Rohtak, Haryana. His parents are Umed Singh and Ramodevi. He has a brother and a sister. Born in the village of Madina, Sangram fought rheumatoid arthritis and got up from the wheelchair to become a wrestler representing India. He also had a brief stint in Delhi Police. Sangram and actress Payal Rohatgi got engaged on 27 February 2014 at a ceremony in Payal's hometown Ahmedabad. He is also a registered organ donor.

Updates of COVID-19 

Sangram Singh launched nationwide mentor-ship campaign  "HaraoCorona, ChampionBanona 21" to combat the impact of the pandemic on everyone, especially youth.
 #CoronaConcerns: Sangram Singh starts a fitness campaign to motivate people
Sangram Singh has not only donated towards PM's relief fund but is also working with an NGO to provide food and basic hygiene kit to more than 8000 migrant labourers in the states of Gujarat, Haryana, and the union territory of Chandigarh.
Sangram singh and Yuva Unstoppable worked together for distribution of safety kit to frontline workers and transform 1000 government schools across India into smart classroom.

Television and radio

Reality Television

Movies

Wrestling

Awards

References

External links
 
 

Male actors from Haryana
Sport wrestlers from Haryana
Living people
Survivor (franchise) contestants
Participants in Indian reality television series
1985 births
Indian male professional wrestlers
Bigg Boss (Hindi TV series) contestants
Professional wrestling in India
Indian professional wrestlers